This is a list of current provincial governors in Burundi.

See also
List of presidents of Burundi
List of heads of government of Burundi
Vice-President of Burundi
 List of mayors of Bujumbura
Lists of office-holders

References

Government of Burundi
Burundi
Provincial governors